Krzysztof Cwalina (born 5 February 1971 in Wrocław, Dolnośląskie) is a retired freestyle swimmer from Poland. He competed for his native country at the 1992 Summer Olympics in Barcelona, Spain, finishing in eighteenth place in the men's fifty-meter freestyle event.

Cwalina graduated with a B.S. and an M.S. in computer science from the University of Iowa.  he is a program manager on the Common Language Runtime team at Microsoft Corporation. He and Brad Abrams coauthored Framework Design Guidelines (Addison-Wesley, 2005; 2nd 2008), winner of a  Jolt Award in 2006.

References

1971 births
Living people
Polish male freestyle swimmers
Swimmers at the 1992 Summer Olympics
Olympic swimmers of Poland
Sportspeople from Wrocław
Microsoft employees
20th-century Polish people
21st-century Polish people
Universiade medalists in swimming
Universiade bronze medalists for Poland
Medalists at the 1991 Summer Universiade